Wyszebórz  is a village in the administrative district of Gmina Manowo, within Koszalin County, West Pomeranian Voivodeship, in north-western Poland.

For the history of the region, see History of Pomerania.

In the years 1975-1998 the town administratively belonged to the province of Koszalin.

References

Villages in Koszalin County